Discover English is an English language college located in Melbourne, Victoria, Australia. Discover English offers general and specialised courses including General English, English for Academic Purposes, Business English, IELTS Preparation and Cambridge ESOL Preparation. The college also operates as an exam centre for the Occupational English Test (OET)

Discover English was founded in 2010 by five educational professionals who wanted to establish an ESL college.

Discover English is located at 247 Collins Street Melbourne, Victoria. The location is in the heart of Melbourne's central business district and offers students five floors of modern facilities, including full Wi-Fi access and software for Computer Assisted Language Learning (CALL).

References

External links
 Discover English website

Schools of English as a second or foreign language
Education in Melbourne